United Nations Security Council resolution 1550, adopted unanimously on 29 June 2004, after considering a report by the Secretary-General Kofi Annan regarding the United Nations Disengagement Observer Force (UNDOF), the Council extended its mandate for a further six months until 31 December 2004.

The resolution called upon the parties concerned to immediately implement Resolution 338 (1973) and requested that the Secretary-General submit a report on the situation at the end of that period.

The Secretary-General's report pursuant to the previous resolution on UNDOF said that the situation between Israel and Syria had remained generally quiet, though the situation in the Middle East as a whole remained dangerous until a settlement could be reached.

See also
 Arab–Israeli conflict
 Golan Heights
 Israel–Syria relations
 List of United Nations Security Council Resolutions 1501 to 1600 (2003–2005)
 2000–2006 Shebaa Farms conflict

References

External links
 
Text of the Resolution at undocs.org

 1550
 1550
 1550
2004 in Israel
2004 in Syria
June 2004 events